The 2012–13 America East men's basketball season began with practices in October 2012, followed by the start of the 2012–13 NCAA Division I men's basketball season in November.

Conference play began in early-January 2013, and concluded in March with the 2013 America East men's basketball tournament first two rounds being held at the University of Albany, and the final held at the University of Vermont.

Preseason Poll

Preseason Poll at AmericaEast.com

Awards

Preseason All-Conference

Asterisk denotes unanimous selection

Preseason All-Conference at AmericaEast.com

All-Conference Teams

 denotes unanimous selection

All-Defensive Team

 denotes unanimous selection

All-Freshmen Team

 denotes unanimous selection

All-Academic Team

Player of the Year
Tommy Brenton of Stony Brook was awarded Player of the Year honors in the 2012-2013 season.

Coach of the Year
Steve Pikiell of Stony Brook was awarded Coach of the Year honors in the 2012-2013 season.

Defensive Player of the Year
Tommy Brenton of Stony Brook was awarded Defensive Player of the Year honors in the 2012-2013 season.

Freshmen of the Year
Jameel Warney of Stony Brook was awarded Freshmen of the year honors in the 2012-2013 season.

References